Fazura is the debut studio album by Malaysian singer Fazura, released on 2017, by Universal Music Malaysia. Marketed exclusively online by Lazada Malaysia and distributed by Universal Music Malaysia, the album consists of 7 songs and 2 bonus tracks.

Production
The album was supposed to be launched in September 2017 as it is an exclusive album project with famous composers from Malaysia and Indonesia. However, the date had to be shifted to November due to time constraints. It took about five months to complete the whole recording process as Fazura had to struggle in between appearances, shoots and other commitments. "When I’m done with work for the day, at night I head to the studio to record my album," she said during an interview.

Release and reception
Fazura was released on November 2, 2017 by Universal Music Malaysia, with Kenny Ong, the managing director or Universal Music Malaysia and Fazura herself as the executive producers. The album was well-received and she managed to grab a gold award at the launch and recorded her own history when it was sold more than 5,000 units. According to Fazura, it is a success that completely unpredictable and she couldn't help crying because she have always been widely criticized by those who doesn't like her singing. "I did not expect this album to succeed in a short time. Furthermore, the current market conditions are quite challenging. I was overwhelmed and happy when the results of my efforts so far have been reversed. I'm working hard to make this album project even though I'm in a tight schedule," said Fazura during her press conference at the album launch.

The album consists of 9 tracks including 2 bonus tracks, an acoustic version of Sayangi Dirimu which was released as a single previously in 2014 and Hancur Aku, a special collaboration single with Malaysian alternative rock band Estranged, released in 2015. Sayangi Dirimu was her first solo single and released digitally on December 14, 2014 and officially on radio by April 23, 2015, as it was Fazura's initial attempt as a singer. Written by Shah Shamshiri and composed by Damian Mikhail, the song has widely received the warm welcome by her fans and it ranked 4th on the Top Charts as it launches on iTunes. Hancur Aku was written and composed by Richael Gimbang, the vocalist from alternative rock Estranged band, based on his personal experience where he was in a relationship that didn't work out at the end. Cinderella, the duet song of the original soundtrack for the drama series Hero Seorang Cinderella with her co star, Fattah Amin has reached number one spot of the local iTunes chart just after its initial release on iTunes. The song was composed by award-winning singer-songwriter Aizat Amdan, it has beaten other songs from international artistes, such as Shape Of You by Ed Sheeran and Something Just Like This by The Chainsmokers and Coldplay in just a day after it was launched on June 3, 2017. Written and composed by Ilyahida also known as Lea Ismail, her band members from The Waklu's, Bangun is a catchy version which has been modified as the new edition compared to the live version in 2015 at her mini showcase, was released together as double singles with Bisa Apa which was recorded in Jakarta in March 2017, written and composed by Indonesian composers, Tantra and Mhala Numata on June 16, 2017 and topped the two charts of iTunes Malaysia charts just after an hour they were launched. Followed by a duet single with Ariadinata from Samsons, a vocalist of a pop-rock band from Indonesia titled Cinta Langka which was released as a lyric video on YouTube on November 30, 2017 and garnered more than 100,000 views to date.

Sahajidah Hai-O Limited Edition
A limited edition of the album consists of 10 songs, including 1 bonus track as the company official theme song titled Hai-O My Choice For Life was also launched at the same time, in conjunction of her appointment as the brand's ambassador. The album was sold separately and exclusively for their registered members.

Commercial performance
The album received platinum award from Universal Music Malaysia, reaching a sales value of more than 200,000 copies combining streaming and units sold globally.

Showcase
On March 18, 2018, a special showcase for her fans was held at Le Meridien Kuala Lumpur and brought by ONEMUSIC, an application that allows fans to get active on social media as well as listen to streamed music. Over 400 fans attended the One Music Live Session showcase and she performed all songs from the album.

Track listing

Personnel
Credits adapted from Fazura booklet liner notes.

Song credits
Bangun
Arranger : Ruviyamin Ruslan
Keys & samples : Ruviyamin Ruslan & Ahmad "Kemat" Khair
Drums : Ruviyamin Ruslan
Bass : Pito
Guitars : Ahmad "Kemat" Khair
Vocal directed by Ilyahida
Mixed by Bijanfx @atasbybijanfx
Mastered by Mokhtar @iseekmusic
Vocal recorded at Dapour Rekaman
Engineered by Efry Arwis & Kecik
All other instruments recorded at @atasbybijanfx

Bisa Apa
Arranger : Tantra Numata
Guitars : Diat Nuno
Vocal directed by : Gege Gumilar
Strings arrangement : Ava Victoria
Violin : RM Condro Kasmoyo, Dessy Saptany Puri, Ava Victoria
Viola : Yacobus Widodo
Cello : Putri Juri Batubara
Mixed & mastered by Ari Renaldi at Aru Studio Bandung
Vocal recorded at Backbeat Studio
Engineered by Anggi Anggoro

Cinderella
Arranger : Anas Amdan
Guitars : Mel Ramlan
Vocal directed by Aizat Amdan
Mixed & Mastered by Anas Amdan
Vocal Recorded at KGE Studio
Engineered by Ahmad "Kemat" Khair

Lalu
Arranger : Richael L Gimbang
Music by : Richael L Gimbang
Vocal directed by Richael L Gimbang
Mixed & Mastered by Jedi Wong & C. L. Toh
Vocal Recorded at 21:05 Studio
Engineered by Jedi Wong

Cinta Langka
Arranger : Andre Dinuth
Guitars : Andre Dinuth
Vocal directed by Andre Dinuth & Yessi Kritianto
Mixed by Eko Sulistyo
Mastered by Steve Corrao, Nashville
Vocal recorded at Studio 168
Engineered by Fay Ismai

Hanya Tuhan Yang Tahu
Piano : Megat Fazzly
Vocal directed by Aylwin Santiago
Mixed by Mohd Tom
Mastered by Bosh Production Studio
Music recorded at WMS Production
Vocal recorded at Bosh Production Studio
Engineered by Billy Ong

Only God Knows
Piano : Megat Fazzly
Vocal directed by Aylwin Santiago
Mixed by Mohd Tom
Mastered by Bosh Production Studio
Music recorded at WMS Production
Vocal recorded at Bosh Production Studio
Engineered by Billy Ong

Sayangi Dirimu
Re-arranged by Ilyahida, Ruviyamin Ruslan & Ahmad "Kemat" Khair
Guitars : Razi Syafie
Vocal directed by Ilyahida
Vocal recorded at Dapour Rekaman
Engineered by Faiz Rosli

Album credits

Executive Producers : Kenny Ong / Universal Music & Fazura
Producers : Tantra Numata, Irfan Aulia (Samsons), Richael L Gimbang (Estranged), Ahmad "Kemat" Khair, Anas Amdan, Alwyn Santiago, Megat Fazzly, Megat Aizzat
Project Manager : Aisyah MC Wong
A&R : Nur Iman Tang
Album Mastering : C. L. Toh (Mastering One)
Album Design : Kenny Wong (Belantara)
Photographer : Bustamam (White Studio)
Wardrobe : House of Doll by Fazura
Styling : Aizat Aidid
Makeup : Khir Khalid
Hairstylist : CK Liow
Commercial (Album) : Yin Siow Paung
New Business : Kim Lim, Shu Hann, Miselyn Lim, Kylie Koh, Carrie Yap
Marketing : Bryan Wong, Minnie Gan, Haruka Tiffany, Tze Mien, Pheobe Heng, Nicholas Han, Clinton Chua
Social Media (@universalmuzikmy) : Julian Head
Digital (Production) : Steven Chen, Rachel Danker
Media & PR : Opie, MC Aisyah (aisyah.wong@umusic.com)
Official Management : Universal Music Sdn Bhd

Accolades
 Gold Award by Universal Music Malaysia

References

External links
 Fazura – Official Website

2017 debut albums
Malay-language albums